Lady Chatterley's Lover is a 1955 French drama film directed by Marc Allégret who co-wrote screenplay with Philippe de Rothschild and Gaston Bonheur, based on the 1928 novel by D. H. Lawrence. In 1955, the film was banned in New York because it "promoted adultery", but it was released in 1959 after the U.S. Supreme Court reversed a lower court's decision.

Cast
 Danielle Darrieux as  Constance Chatterley
 Erno Crisa as  Oliver Mellors
 Leo Genn as  Sir Clifford Chatterley
 Berthe Tissen  as Mrs. Bolton
  Janine Crispin as Hilda
 Jean Murat as Baron Leslie Winter
 Gérard Séty as  Michaelis
 Jacqueline Noëlle as  Bertha Mellors

See also
 Lady Chatterley's Lover (1981)
 Lady Chatterley (1993)
 Lady Chatterley (2006)

References

External links
 
 
 

Films based on Lady Chatterley's Lover
1955 films
French drama films
1955 drama films
Films directed by Marc Allégret
American black-and-white films
Films set in England
Films set in the 1920s
Adultery in films
Films scored by Joseph Kosma
1950s French films